This is a list of mountains and hills of Russia.

List by elevation

Over 5000 meters

4000 to 4999 meters

3000 to 3999 meters

2000 to 2999 meters

1000 to 1999 meters

Under 1000 metres

See also

 Highest points of Russian Federal subjects
 List of Altai mountains
 List of mountains in Mongolia
 List of mountains in China
 List of ultras of Northeast Asia
 List of volcanoes in Russia
 List of lakes of Russia

Notes

References

External links

 Russia - Highest Mountains from GeoNames
 Tallest Mountains In Russia from World Atlas
 Russia mountains from Peakery

 
Russia
Russia
Russia
Mountains and hills
Russia
 
Russia